Francisco "Kiko" Miguel Ribeiro Tomé Tavares Bondoso (born 17 November 1995) is a Portuguese professional footballer who plays for F.C. Vizela as a winger.

Club career
Bondoso was born in Moimenta da Beira, Viseu District. He spent his first seven seasons as a senior in the third division or lower.

Bondoso signed with F.C. Vizela of the third tier in the summer of 2019, from Lusitano FCV. He was part of the squads that earned two promotions in as many seasons to reach the Primeira Liga, scoring three goals in 29 Liga Portugal 2 matches in the second and subsequently renewing his contract until 30 June 2024.

On 6 August 2021, Bondoso made his debut in the Portuguese top flight, starting in a 3–0 away loss against Sporting CP. He scored his first goal the following weekend, helping the hosts come from behind to defeat C.D. Tondela 2–1.

References

External links

1995 births
Living people
Sportspeople from Viseu District
Portuguese footballers
Association football wingers
Primeira Liga players
Liga Portugal 2 players
Campeonato de Portugal (league) players
Lusitano FCV players
F.C. Vizela players